Nora's Hair Salon 2: A Cut Above is a 2008 comedy-drama film written by Chanel Capra and Jill Maxcy, who also directed. It stars Tatyana Ali, Stacey Dash, and Bobby Brown.  The sequel to 2004's Nora's Hair Salon, it features mostly the same cast as the original.  (The eventual third film, Nora's Hair Salon 3: Shear Disaster, featured a completely new set of actors.)

Plot summary
Recently deceased beauty-salon owner Nora has bequeathed her business to her two estranged nieces, who are at odds regarding the best way to make the most of their inheritance.

Cast
Tatyana Ali — Lilliana
Stacey Dash — Simone
Christine Carlo — Xenobia
Donn Swaby — Delicious
Bobby Brown — Caress/Old Man Butter
Brandi Burnside — Tashina
Clearthur Lee III — Sensation
Ananda Lewis — Ananda
Don Wilson Moore — Dexter Lewis
Claudine Oriol — Jill
Jonny Siew — Ling
Lucille Soong — Ming
Jean-Claude La Marre — Devin
Mekhi Phifer — Maxwell Terry

References

External links
 
 

2008 films
20th Century Fox films
African-American films
American comedy-drama films
2008 comedy-drama films
Films shot in Los Angeles
2008 comedy films
2008 drama films
2000s English-language films
2000s American films